SM UB-59 was a German Type UB III submarine or U-boat in the German Imperial Navy during World War I. She was commissioned into the Flanders Flotilla of the German Imperial Navy on 25 August 1917 as SM UB-59.

 
She operated as part of the Flanders Flotilla based in Zeebrugge. UB-59 scuttled 5 October 1918 off Zeebrugge at  during the evacuation of Belgium by German forces.

Construction

She was built by AG Weser, Bremen and following just under a year of construction, launched at Bremen on 21 July 1917. UB-59 was commissioned later that same year . Like all Type UB III submarines, UB-59 carried 10 torpedoes and was armed with a  deck gun. UB-59 had a displacement of  while surfaced and  when submerged. Her engines enabled her to travel at  when surfaced and  when submerged.

Summary of raiding history

References

Notes

Citations

Bibliography 

 

German Type UB III submarines
World War I submarines of Germany
U-boats commissioned in 1917
U-boats scuttled in 1918
Maritime incidents in 1918
World War I shipwrecks in the English Channel
1917 ships
Ships built in Bremen (state)